Clarence Reynold Skeete (3 June 1916 – 22 December 2001) was a cricketer who played first-class cricket for Trinidad from 1942 to 1952.

His best bowling figures were 6 for 99 for Trinidad against Jamaica in 1946. His highest score was 111 against Barbados in 1948-49; in the match he scored 37 and 111 and took 3 for 85 and 4 for 118.

References

External links
 Clarence Skeete at Cricket Archive

1916 births
2001 deaths
Trinidad and Tobago cricketers